Toll Brothers is a company which designs, builds, markets, sells, and arranges financing for residential and commercial properties in the United States.  In 2020, the company was the fifth largest home builder in the United States, based on homebuilding revenue.  The company is ranked 411th on the Fortune 500. 

In 2021, the company sold homes at an average selling price of $844,400.  Average prices ranged from $663,700 in the South region to $1,376,800 in the Pacific region.

History 
Toll Brothers was founded in 1967 in Pennsylvania by Robert I. Toll and Bruce E. Toll. Robert received a law degree from University of Pennsylvania and his B.A. from Cornell University, while his brother Bruce had an accounting degree from the University of Miami. Their father, Albert, built homes and the brothers believed that the new home industry had more to offer. Bruce was 26 and Robert was 27 at the time.

Toll Brothers was incorporated as a Delaware corporation with a public offering raising $40 million.

In addition to luxury single-family, carriage house/townhouse and condominium residences, Toll Brothers offers luxury rental apartments (Apartment Living division) and luxury student housing (Campus Living division).  They also operate various ancillary businesses including mortgage, insurance, home automation/security, and landscaping.

Executives 
Robert Toll stepped down as Chairman in 2018 and served exclusively as Special Advisor to the company.

Douglas C. Yearley, Jr. joined Toll Brothers in 1990 and was promoted as Chief Executive Officer in June 2010 and currently holds the position of Chairman and Chief Executive Officer.  Doug also serves as Co-Chair of the Pennsylvania Chapter of American Cancer Society's CEO's Against Cancer.  
Martin Connor was hired as Chief Financial Officer in 2010.

Robert Parahus was promoted to Chief Operating Officer and Executive President in 2020.

Acquisitions 
Toll Brothers has made thirteen acquisitions since 1995: West Texas Woodlands 
 
Geoffrey H. Edmunds in Scottsdale, Arizona (1995), Coleman Homes' Las Vegas Division (1998), Silverman Homes in metro Detroit (1999), Richard R. Dostie (2003) and The Manhattan Building Company (2003) in northern New Jersey, the central Florida Division of Landstar Homes (2005), CamWest Development in Seattle, Washington (2011), Shapell Industries in California (2014), Coleman Homes in Boise, Idaho (2016), Sharp Residential in Atlanta, Georgia (2019), Sabal Homes in South Carolina (2019), Thrive Residential in Nashville and Atlanta (2020) and Keller Homes in Colorado Springs (2020).

Awards 
In 2014 Builder Magazine and in 2012 Professional Builder Magazine named Toll Brothers 'Builder of the Year'.

In 2016, Toll Brothers takes the #1 spot for the honors of the "World's Most Admired Company/Home Builders" by FORTUNE magazine and "America's Most Trusted Builder" by Lifestory Research.

In 2020, Toll Brothers was named the #1 Most Admired Home Builder for the sixth consecutive year in the FORTUNE magazine survey of the World’s Most Admired Companies.

Disputes
Toll Brothers was sued in April 2007 by a group of investors claiming they were misled by directors about their ability to maintain historically high-earnings during the downturn in the U.S. residential real estate market. Toll Brothers agreed to settle the suit for $25 million, though they did not admit any wrongdoing.

Six residents at the Northside Piers development complained of faulty window seals that leaked in air and rain when windy. The project gained notoriety in 2007 when a kettle of roofing tar on the top level caught fire during construction and although quickly contained produced a significant amount of smoke. After meeting with the residents Toll Brothers agreed to fix the seals. Toll Brothers sued the contractor who installed the windows for $10 million.

In 2012, the company was required to pay a penalty of $741,000 for numerous alleged violations of the Clean Water Act, including more than 600 relating to runoff of stormwater at its building sites, among them sites in the Chesapeake Bay Watershed.  Toll Brothers agreed to implement storm-water training and prevention techniques across the entire company.

References

Companies listed on the New York Stock Exchange
Construction and civil engineering companies of the United States
American companies established in 1967
Home builders
Companies based in Montgomery County, Pennsylvania
Construction and civil engineering companies established in 1967
1967 establishments in Pennsylvania